The 2012 Castilla y León Cup (Spanish: Copa Castilla y León 2012) is the fourth edition of this football trophy in its renewed version.

Teams participants

Group stage

Group A

Group B

Group C

Group D

Knockout stage

References

See also
Castilla y León Cup
2011 Castilla y León Cup

2012
2012–13 in Spanish football cups